The Old Barracks is a historic building on the campus of the Virginia Military Institute in Lexington, Virginia.  Built in 1848 and repeatedly enlarged and redesigned by a succession of architects, it includes at its core the oldest surviving building of the campus.  The building was declared a National Historic Landmark in 1965 for its architecture and its association with nation's oldest state-supported military academy.

Description and history
The campus of the Virginia Military Institute (VMI) is located on the north side of the city of Lexington.  At its center is a large parade ground, around which a significant number of the institute's buildings are arrayed.  The Old Barracks are located along the northeastern edge of the ground, forming a long arcing facade.  There are three sections, each of which presents a bank of windows, with a projecting central entry.  The projecting sections have polygonal towers with crenellated tops at the corners, with similar lower towers at the eastern end of the structure and at the junctions between the sections.  The tower at the western end of the structure is square with angled corners, and matches in height the entrance towers.

VMI was founded in 1839, and is the first and best-known of the nation's state-funded military academies.  Most of the institute's early buildings were demolished during the American Civil War, with only a portion of the barracks building surviving.  This portion was designed by architect Alexander Jackson Davis and built in 1848, and was a fine piece of early Gothic Revival architecture that influenced the other buildings present on the campus.  In the 1890s the building was redesigned by Isaac Eugene Alexander Rose, and in 1916 it was enlarged to design work by Benjamin Grosvenor Goodhue, which created the first complete quadrangle.  In 1948 the building was further extended by the addition of a new wing, designed by Carneal and Johnson.

See also
List of National Historic Landmarks in Virginia
National Register of Historic Places listings in Lexington, Virginia

References

External links

Virginia Military Institute, Barracks, Virginia Military Institute Parade Grounds, Lexington, VA: 3 photos, 23 data pages and supplemental material, at Historic American Buildings Survey

Historic American Buildings Survey in Virginia
University and college buildings on the National Register of Historic Places in Virginia
National Historic Landmarks in Virginia
Buildings and structures in Lexington, Virginia
Virginia Military Institute campus
Residential buildings completed in 1848
Gothic Revival architecture in Virginia
National Register of Historic Places in Lexington, Virginia
Individually listed contributing properties to historic districts on the National Register in Virginia
Alexander Jackson Davis buildings
Barracks on the National Register of Historic Places